Castro Laboreiro is a village and a former civil parish in the municipality of Melgaço in the Viana do Castelo District, Portugal. In 2013, the parish merged into the new parish Castro Laboreiro e Lamas de Mouro. It is in the mountain range of the Laboreiro. As of 2001 the area had 726 inhabitants. The name derives from Castro, a hill fort, and Lepporariu, "of hares", a Latin name from Roman times.

History and scenery 

There are many archaeological sites in the area that show evidence of very early human occupation.

Cascata do Laboreiro, a waterfall on the Homem River, can be seen from the walls of the ruin of the Castle of Castro Laboreiro, situated above the town.

Roman and medieval bridges are found nearby over the various rivers, including the Laboreiro River, Mire River, and others.

For centuries, the domain passed back and forth between Christian and Muslim rulers. In 1141, D. Afonso Henriques (1112–1185) took control of the castle. In 1944, the castle was classified by the government as a National Monument.

The village also has a pre-Romanesque church, Santa Maria da Visitação, built in the 9th century. The Feast of Santa Maria da Visitação is held on July 6 each year.

Points of interest:
Castle of Castro Laboreiro
Church of Santa Maria da Visitação
Pelourinho de Castro Laboreiro
Ponte de Varziela
Ponte das Caínheiras
Ponte de Assureira, Capela de S. Brás e Moinho de Água
Ponte de Dorna
Ponte Nova da Cava da Velha

See also 

 Architecture of Portugal
 Peneda-Gerês National Park
 List of bridges in Portugal
 Megalith
 Cão de Castro Laboreiro (Dog of Castro Laboreiro)

References

External links 
 images, slideshow,Castro Laboreiro 
 slideshow of archeological sites
 Castrum Villae